The 1960–61 Nationalliga A season was the 23rd season of the Nationalliga A, the top level of ice hockey in Switzerland. Eight teams participated in the league, and Zurcher SC won the championship.

Regular season

Relegation 
 Lausanne HC - SC Langnau 2:4/3:8'

External links
 Championnat de Suisse 1960/61

Swiss
National League (ice hockey) seasons
1961–62 in Swiss ice hockey